Fares is a village in the municipal unit of Farres, Achaea, Greek. It is located on the left bank of the river Peiros, 2 km southeast of Isoma and 17 km south of Patras. In 2011 Fares had a population of 466 for the village and 519 for the community, which includes the village Prevedos. Prevedos is on the Greek National Road 33 (Patras - Tripoli).

History

Fares is named after the ancient town Pharae, which might be named after the Greek mythological figure Pharis, son of Hermes and the Danaid Philodameia. Pharae was located 150 stadia (28 km) from Patras and 70 stadia (13 km) from the sea, and was built by the banks of the river Peiros. It was part of the Achaean Dynasty and later the Achaean League.

Population

See also

List of settlements in Achaea
Pharae

References

External links

 Fares at the GTP Travel Pages

Populated places in Achaea